The women's half marathon at the 2016 European Athletics Championships took place at the Olympic Stadium on 10 July. Due to 2016 being an Olympic year the marathon was replaced by a half marathon. It was the first time that the half marathon had been run during the European Championships.

Records

Schedule

Results

Final

Individual

Team

References

Half marathon W
Half marathons
2016 in women's athletics